Gored gored is a raw beef dish eaten in Ethiopia and Eritrea. Whereas kitfo is minced beef marinated in spices and clarified butter, gored gored is cubed and left unmarinated. Like kitfo, it is widely popular and considered a national dish. It is often served with mitmita (a powdered seasoning mix) and awaze (a type of mustard and chilli sauce). 

Although the dish is sometimes compared to kitfo, gored gored is not eaten after being marinated in spices and butter. It is frequently served with injera flatbread, awaze chili sauce, and lemon wedges.

Usually, the fat is left on the meat and eaten with it. Gored gored can be served as a stand-alone dish or in combination with the aforementioned ingredients, but it can also be included in a larger dinner, particularly during festive occasions and festivals.

See also 
 Cuisine of Ethiopia
 Cuisine of Eritrea
 Kitfo
 List of African dishes
 Steak tartare

References

Ethiopian cuisine
Eritrean cuisine
Raw beef dishes
National dishes